Will Thrasher was lynched by a large mob of white men on February 2, 1922, for an alleged assault on a white school teacher.

Alleged assault
Miss Myrtle Bailey was a white school teacher at the Fairplay school in Crystal Springs, Mississippi. Around noon on February 1, 1922, she was leaving the school when a black man emerged from the woods and tried to embrace her. She screamed and when a nearby farmer came near the man ran off. For the rest of the day and into the early morning of February 2, 1922, black men were brought before Ms. Bailey for her to identify. A black man was found in the house of Harvey Bass and at 1:00 AM on February 2, 1922, he was brought before Myrtle Bailey, who identified him as the man who allegedly assaulted her.

Lynching
His body was bullet-ridden and on his foot was a pencil-written note, "Positively identified." A white mob of 250 unmasked men were said to have taken part in the lynching.

Bibliography 
Notes

References

1922 riots
1922 in Mississippi
African-American history of Mississippi
Deaths by person in Mississippi
Lynching deaths in Mississippi 
February 1922 events
Protest-related deaths
Racially motivated violence against African Americans 
Riots and civil disorder in Mississippi 
White American riots in the United States